Babe (ベイブ pronounced "Babe"), stylized "BaBe", was a Japanese pop duo, composed of Tomoko Kondo and Yukari Nikaido. They debuted in February 1987 with "Give Me Up", a cover of Michael Fortunati's original song. From February 1987 to February 1990 they had several hits including "I Don't Know", "Somebody Loves You", and "Get a Chance!".

Their highest single ranking on the Oricon charts was #4 in 1987 for Somebody Loves You. They sang "Get A Chance!" as the end theme and post-credits music video in the third Project A-ko anime and the television adaptation of Hana no Asuka-gumi!. They also sang an all English song, "Love in the First Degree" (a cover of the Bananarama single).

They disbanded in February 1990 because of Yukari's marriage and pregnancy.

Members
 was born on February 17, 1968, in Tokyo, Japan.
 was born on August 29, 1967, in Tokyo, Japan.

Discography

Albums
Bravo! - June 21, 1987
Nice! - December 5, 1987
Good! - January 5, 1988
Fight - June 21, 1988
Brand New - April 21, 1989
Contrast - February 22, 1990
The Best of BaBe - May 21, 1990
BaBe Best - March 20, 2002

Singles
"Give Me Up" - February 21, 1987
"I Don't Know!" - May 2, 1987
"Somebody Loves You" - September 10, 1987
"Hold Me" - October 21, 1987
"Tonight" - January 21, 1988
"Get a Chance" - May 11, 1988
"Wake Up!" - August 31, 1988
"She Has a Dream" - March 1, 1989

References

External links
 BaBe Archives
 Encyclopedia Idollica
 Images

Japanese idol groups
Japanese pop music groups
Japanese girl groups
Japanese musical duos
Musical groups established in 1987
1987 establishments in Japan
Musical groups disestablished in 1990
1990 disestablishments in Japan
Musical groups from Tokyo
Pop music duos